Amiaya (stylized as AMIAYA) is a Japanese music duo of twin sisters.

The sisters are also fashion models and collaborated with Scandal for the artwork of their 2018 album Honey.

In 2019, Amiaya starred in an international commercial campaign for ice cream brand Häagen-Dazs.

Discography

Mini-albums
 Tokyo Pop (January 23, 2013)

Singles
 (April 10, 2013)
 "Star Line" (August 7, 2013)
 "Pink Lady Mash Up 2015" (December 31, 2014)

Digital singles
 "Play that Music" (January 16, 2013)
 "Icon (#YourIcon version)" (April 30, 2014)
 "Fairy Song" (May 21, 2014)
 "XXsupafreaks" (July 2, 2014)

Other album appearances
 "Rocket Dive" - hide Tribute VI: Female Spirits
 "26.PLAY THAT MUSIC (banvox REMIX)" - A-TTENT↑ON mixed by DJ MAYUMI

Bibliography
 "Aya☆Ami " (July 16, 2010)
 "Amiaya Twins " (May 10, 2014)

Videography

TV Shows
 2010: "読モTV〜TOKYO GIRLS PROJECT〜" - Regular appearance

Dramas
 2012: "GTO: Great Teacher Onizuka " - Riko Sakaki, Miko Sakaki - S1E5

References

External links 

Official Website

1988 births
Living people
Japanese musical duos
Musical groups from Shizuoka Prefecture
Twin musical duos
Pop music duos

Female musical duos